Rocket Fuel was an ad technology company based in Redwood City, California. It was founded in 2008 by alumni of Yahoo!.

Rocket Fuel completed an initial public offering in September 2013. The initial stock offering was $29 per share and reached a high of $59.95 per share when the stock opened. The stock closed at $56.10 per share on opening day, giving the company a value of $942.5 million. By February 24, 2015, the stock had dropped to $9.63, or 86 percent below its record high and 67 percent below its IPO price.

Rocket Fuel acquired the New York-based ad tech company [x+1] in August 2014 for $230 million.

In 2017, the company was acquired by Sizmek, a private ad tech company owned by Vector Capital; one outcome of this was a retreat from public company status back to being a private company.

In November 2017, Sizmek retired the brand Rocket Fuel.

References

External links

 

Big data companies
Technology companies established in 2008
2008 establishments in California
Companies based in Redwood City, California
Companies formerly listed on the Nasdaq
Online advertising
2013 initial public offerings